Höllentalbahn may refer to:

 Höllentalbahn (Black Forest),  a railway from Freiburg im Breisgau to Donaueschingen through the Black Forest in Baden-Württemberg, Germany
 Höllentalbahn (Bavaria), a railway from Marxgrün, Bavaria to Blankenstein, Thuringia in Germany
 Höllentalbahn (Lower Austria), a railway from Payerbach-Reichenau to the beginning of the Hölle Valley in Lower Austria, Austria